The True North trilogy is a series of horror comedy films written and directed by Kevin Smith. It consists of the films Tusk (2014), Yoga Hosers (2016), and the upcoming Moose Jaws (2023).

Films
Tusk is based on a story from Kevin Smith's SModcast podcast. It stars Michael Parks, Justin Long, Haley Joel Osment, Johnny Depp and Genesis Rodriguez. The film premiered at the Toronto International Film Festival, before it was released on September 19, 2014, by A24.

Yoga Hosers is a spin-off of Tusk. It starred Johnny Depp alongside his daughter Lily-Rose Depp and Smith's daughter Harley Quinn Smith. Production began in August 2014.

The film premiered at a midnight screening during the Sundance Film Festival. Invincible Pictures acquired distribution rights to the film, and released it on September 2, 2016.

Moose Jaws is basically "Jaws with a moose". In June 2015, Harley Morenstein of Epic Meal Time confirmed he will be the lead in the film, following an appearance in the other two offerings. Also in June, Smith revealed that Harley Quinn Smith and Lily-Rose Depp will reprise their roles from Yoga Hosers. In September 2015, Kevin Smith mentioned that his character Silent Bob will be eaten by the killer moose. In 2017, Smith revealed that Johnny Depp would reprise his role as Guy LaPointe, and that the actor suggested that his character be eaten by a moose.

In January 2016, Smith confirmed that Jay and Silent Bob will appear in Moose Jaws, setting the True North trilogy within the View Askewniverse. In February 2016, Smith stated filming on Moose Jaws would start in July 2016 in Saskatchewan, Canada. Smith later said filming was slated to begin in May 2016. In June 2018 during a live recording of Smith's podcast Fatman on Batman, he said that he had secured funding for Moose Jaws. In April 2020, while on Instagram talking about his finished first draft of Twilight of the Mallrats, Smith stated he is working on a new draft of Moose Jaws. In June 2020, Smith revealed he removed Jay and Silent Bob from the latest draft of Moose Jaws.

Recurring cast

Reception

Critical response

References

Films directed by Kevin Smith
Trilogies